Shisen  may refer to:
 the Chinese Sichuan Province (四川) in Japanese
 Shisen-dō (詩仙堂), a Buddhist temple of the Sōtō Zen sect in Sakyō-ku, Kyoto, Japan
 Shisen-Sho (四川省), a Japanese tile-based game similar to Mahjong solitaire
 Heart Aid Shisen (Japanese: ハートエイド・四川, Chinese: 心系四川),  a major fund raising concert held on July 14, 2008, in Tokyo, Japan for the victims of the 2008 Sichuan earthquake